The 13th African Games is expected to be held in three cities in Ghana in 2024 on dates yet to be confirmed. This will be the second time in history that the games will be decentralized in a process that started in the previous edition held in Morocco. The three cities chosen for these functions are Accra, Kumasi, and Cape Coast.

Bids

  Accra, Ghana (elected)
  Abuja, Nigeria
  Ouagadougou, Burkina Faso

Ghana won the rights to host the event in October 2018. In November 2021, Ghana signed an agreement with the African Union to host the event.

Venues

Plans to build a new stadium for the event were cancelled due to the COVID-19 pandemic.

The new Borteyman Sports Complex located in Borteyman, Accra is intended to be used for indoor sports.

Branding 

The mascot, the logo and the website of the event were unveiled in December 2021.

Participating nations

Sports

Squash is expected to feature at the 13th African Games. In February 2022, it was announced that cricket will make its debut in the 2023 edition of the games. Arm wrestling and rugby union are also set to make their debut. A total of 23 sports games have been confirmed for the continental event.

Demonstration sports:

2023 African Para Games

In January 2022, president of the International Paralympic Committee Andrew Parsons visited Ghana in support of the 2023 African Para Games which are also to be held in Ghana.

See also

 African Games
 2023 Africa Cup of Nations

References

External links
 Official website
 All about African Games

 
African Games
African Games 2023
African Games
African Games
2023 in Africa
2023 in Ghana